Pamela Dawber (born October 18, 1951) is an American actress best known for her lead television sitcom roles as Mindy McConnell in Mork & Mindy (1978–1982) and Samantha Russell in My Sister Sam (1986–1988).

Early life
Dawber was born in Detroit, the older of two daughters of Thelma M. (née Fisher) and Eugene E. Dawber, a commercial artist. She went to Reid Elementary School in Goodrich and attended North Farmington High School and Oakland Community College (OCC), with the intention of transferring to a four-year college. She deferred her studies at OCC to do some modeling work and eventually dropped out after deciding to go into modeling full-time.

Career
Dawber moved to New York City and was initially a fashion model with Wilhelmina Models before switching to acting. She appeared in several television commercials during the 1970s (Fotomat, Noxzema, Neet, Underalls, etc.). 

Dawber screen-tested for the title role in Tabitha, a 1977–1978 situation comedy spun off from Bewitched, but the role instead went to Lisa Hartman. However, ABC executives were impressed enough with her to enroll her in its "talent development" program, which paid its participants until they could find appropriate roles. Garry K. Marshall recruited her from this program.

Breakthrough: Mork & Mindy
Dawber's professional breakthrough came when Marshall chose her, despite her having relatively little acting experience and not having auditioned for the part, as one of the two title characters of the ABC sitcom Mork & Mindy, which ran from 1978 to 1982. She portrayed Mindy McConnell, the comedic foil and eventual love interest for the extraterrestrial Mork from the planet Ork, played by a then-unknown Robin Williams. The show was extremely popular in its debut season, when it averaged at number three in the Nielsen ratings for the year. The only major difficulty for her on set was that she often found it impossible to maintain the proper composure in character in the face of her co-star's comedic talent. Also, pressure came from the TV network to sexualize her character as the series progressed, which Dawber successfully resisted, with Williams' support.

The Pirates of Penzance
Dawber sang in a 1980s Los Angeles Civic Light Opera production of Gilbert & Sullivan's The Pirates of Penzance, based on the Joseph Papp/New York Shakespeare Festival production. Her role, as Mabel, had been played by Linda Ronstadt in the New York run of the show.

My Sister Sam
From 1986 to 1988, Dawber again had the title role in a television series, playing Samantha Russell in the CBS sitcom My Sister Sam, co-starring Rebecca Schaeffer. The series was a success in its first season, but it suffered a massive ratings drop in its second after moving to Saturday night. My Sister Sam was cancelled in April 1988, with half of the second season's episodes never shown on CBS, but eventually broadcast (along with all previous episodes) on USA Network.

In July 1989, over a year after the show's cancellation, Schaeffer was shot and killed in front of her apartment in Los Angeles by Robert John Bardo, a man who had stalked her for three years. Dawber was reportedly  "devastated" by her former co-star's death. Dawber and her other surviving My Sister Sam co-stars, Joel Brooks, David Naughton and Jenny O'Hara, all participated in a filmed public service announcement about gun violence prevention, and Dawber herself became a gun control advocate. With the birth of her second child, she largely retired from the entertainment industry for family reasons, acting sporadically during the 1990s.

Film work
Although mostly known for her television work, Dawber has starred in several films, including the comedy movie Stay Tuned (1992) with John Ritter and the period movie I'll Remember April (1999), alongside husband Mark Harmon.

Return to television
In 1997, Dawber starred in the short-lived sitcom Life... and Stuff on CBS. 

In 2014, she reunited with Robin Williams on his comedy series The Crazy Ones as a love interest of Williams's character. But the reunion failed to boost the show's ratings, and it was cancelled shortly afterwards. Williams, already suffering from Lewy body disease by this time, died by suicide later that year.

Dawber is a national spokeswoman for Big Brothers Big Sisters of America. Garry K. Marshall, the film-and-television comedy writer-producer-director who enabled Dawber's professional breakthrough, died in 2016. That year, Dawber made a guest appearance on The Odd Couple in a tribute episode to Marshall, along with other Marshall alumni Ron Howard, Garry's sister Penny Marshall, Cindy Williams, Anson Williams, Don Most and Marion Ross.

For the first time in her career, she appeared with her husband and fellow actor, Mark Harmon on CBS' NCIS in 2021 for seven episodes as '"seasoned investigative journalist" Marcie Warren.

Personal life
Dawber married actor Mark Harmon on March 21, 1987, in a private ceremony. They have two sons: Sean Thomas Harmon (born April 25, 1988), also an actor, and Ty Christian Harmon (born June 25, 1992). The couple maintains a private family life and rarely appear in public with their children, or speak about one another in interviews.

Filmography
Television

Film

References

External links
 

1951 births
20th-century American actresses
21st-century American actresses
Actresses from Detroit
Female models from Michigan
American film actresses
American television actresses
American voice actresses
North Farmington High School alumni
Oakland Community College alumni
Living people
People from Farmington Hills, Michigan